"I Can't Break Down" is a song written by Sinéad Quinn, Pete Glenister, and Deni Lew for Quinn's debut album, Ready to Run (2003). Produced by Glenister and Lew, it was released as her debut single from the album in February 2003 and reached a peak position of number two in the UK Singles Chart and finished in 65th place for the best-selling UK singles of 2003.

Background and writing
Quinn finished as the runner-up in the first series of Fame Academy behind David Sneddon. She signed a record deal with Mercury Records a week after the final and revealed that she would release her debut single on 10 February 2003. Sneddon had a number one single with "Stop Living the Lie in January 2003.
 
The song was written by Quinn during her time on Fame Academy. Fame Academy differed from the similar Pop Idol in that the contestants were able to develop their all-round musical talents and write original material during their time on the show. In an interview with the BBC she revealed how her experience on Fame Academy had changed her music style for this song. She said "Before I went in, I wouldn't have been into commercial stuff...my tunes might not have been so radio-friendly, but I'm working on it. I wouldn't have got that much of a hook into my songs. I think the hook is very important."

Critical reception
The song received mixed reviews from music critics. Michael Hubbard (writing for musicOMH) described Quinn's voice as "rich" in comparison to her vocal performance on Fame Academy'' but commented "if Sinéad wants a career that is more than a flash in the pan, she's going to have to get a lot more dangerous than this". He did, however, commend her for avoiding being like a "karaoke star-turn of the genre's lesser programmes."

Track listings
UK CD single
 "I Can't Break Down
 "Don't Speak"
 "I Try" (acoustic)

UK cassette single
 "I Can't Break Down"
 "I Try" (acoustic)

Charts

Weekly charts

Year-end charts

References

2003 singles
Mercury Records singles
Number-one singles in Scotland
Songs written by Pete Glenister
Songs written by Deni Lew